Diego Albadoro (born 26 February 1989) is a professional Italian football player. He plays for Picerno.

Club career
On 5 August 2019, he signed with Avellino.

On 8 October 2020, he joined Serie D club Picerno. He helped Picerno achieve promotion to Serie C at the end of the 2020–21 season.

References

External links
 
 

1989 births
Footballers from Naples
Living people
Italian footballers
Association football forwards
S.S.C. Giugliano players
S.S.C. Bari players
S.S. Juve Stabia players
Matera Calcio players
Ternana Calcio players
U.S. Avellino 1912 players
AZ Picerno players
Serie B players
Serie C players
Serie D players
21st-century Italian people